High Sheriff of Galway may refer to either of two High Shrievalties

High Sheriff of County Galway, which covers the County of Galway
High Sheriff of Galway Town, which covers the County of the Town of Galway